The 1983 United Virginia Bank Classic, also known as the Richmond WCT, was a men's tennis tournament played on indoor carpet courts in Richmond, Virginia, United States. The event was part of 1983 World Championship Tennis circuit. It was the 18th edition of the tournament and was held from February 7 through February 13, 1983. Second-seeded Guillermo Vilas won the singles title and the $100,000 first-prize money.

Finals

Singles
 Guillermo Vilas defeated  Steve Denton 6–3, 7–5, 6–4
 It was Vilas' first singles title of the year and the 60th of his career.

Doubles
 Pavel Složil /  Tomáš Šmíd defeated  Fritz Buehning /  Brian Teacher 6–2, 6–4

References

External links
 ITF tournament edition details

United Virginia Bank Classic
United Virginia Bank Classic
United Virginia Bank Classic
United Virginia Bank Classic